Macrophthalmus holthuisi is a species of crab in the family Macrophthalmidae. It was described by Sèrene in 1973.

References

Ocypodoidea
Crustaceans described in 1973